Face to Face is the debut album by jazz organist Baby Face Willette featuring performances recorded and released on the Blue Note label in 1961.

Reception

The contemporaneous DownBeat reviewer stated: "If it is warm and appealing visceral music, it is also wholly predictable. There's not a single surprise on either side". The AllMusic review by Thom Jurek awarded the album 4 stars and stated "Face to Face boasts a mighty meat and potatoes soul-jazz lineup... Highly recommended".

Track listing
All compositions by Baby Face Willette except as indicated

 "Swingin' at Sugar Ray's" - 6:35
 "Goin' Down" - 7:24
 "Whatever Lola Wants" (Richard Adler, Jerry Ross) - 7:21
 "Face to Face" - 6:17
 "Somethin' Strange" - 6:42
 "High 'N' Low" - 7:07
 "Face to Face" [Alternate take] - 6:52 Bonus track on CD reissue
 "Somethin' Strange" [Alternate take] - 6:41 Bonus track on CD reissue

Personnel
Baby Face Willette – organ
Grant Green – guitar
Ben Dixon – drums
Fred Jackson – tenor saxophone

References

Blue Note Records albums
Baby Face Willette albums
1961 albums
Albums produced by Alfred Lion
Albums recorded at Van Gelder Studio